Zdzisław Ulatowski is a former Polish professional football player (midfielder) and manager. He is the father of Rafał.

References

1949 births
Living people
Footballers from Łódź
Polish footballers
Association football midfielders
ŁKS Łódź players
ŁKS Łódź managers